Pachyosteomorphi is an extinct clade of arthrodire placoderms within the Eubrachythoraci (of the suborder Brachythoraci), armored fish most diverse during the Devonian. Most are considered to be pelagic (open ocean) long-distance swimmers, leading to their widespread distribution beginning from at least the Middle Devonian period.

Phylogeny
Pachyosteomorphi is the sister taxon to Coccosteomorphi, which together are the two main sub-clades of Eubrachythoraci. Pachyosteomorphi can be further sub-divided into Aspinothoracidi and Dunkleosteoidea, as shown in the cladogram below:

References

Arthrodires